Brian Ickler (born September 17, 1985) is a former American professional stock car racing driver.

Racing career

Early career
Ickler started in off-road racing when he was 14 years old. At 17, he was SCORE rookie of the year, Lite champion, and the winner of the SCORE Baja 1000, Baja 500, and San Felipe 250. In 2005, Ickler raced his first year on an oval track at Irwindale Speedway in the NASCAR Weekly Racing Series Super Late Model Division. In his rookie season, he earned his first win in the NASCAR Hot Wheels 200. In 2006, Ickler signed with Bill McAnally Racing to drive the No. 20 NAPA Filters Chevrolet in the NASCAR AutoZone West Series. He recorded a first-place finish in the qualifying race at the Toyota All-Star Showdown and finished 5th. Ickler drove the No. 16 NAPA Auto Parts Chevrolet for the 2007 West Series season. He finished the season 4th in the championship standings and led the series with three wins. Ickler was awarded the NASCAR GNW Driver Achievement award two years in a row (2006, 2007) for his accomplishments in the series. In 2008, he relocated to Mooresville, North Carolina and ran the full NASCAR Camping World East Series schedule, where he earned three wins, two poles, and two track records. He led the series in laps led, leading 26 percent of total laps raced.

NASCAR national series
In 2008, Ickler made his Nationwide Series debut, finishing 34th at Phoenix International Raceway in the No. 55 Dodge for Robby Gordon Motorsports.

In 2009, Ickler made 11 starts in the Camping World Truck Series for Billy Ballew Motorsports. He also had two starts in the Nationwide Series for Braun Racing and six starts in the ARCA Re/Max Series in his own Ickler Motorsports entry. In the Truck Series, he has two top fives, three top tens, and one pole. He also had two DNFs. In his two Nationwide Series starts, he finished 32nd and 26th at Iowa Speedway and Memphis Motorsports Park, respectively.

In the 2010 NASCAR Camping World Truck Series, Ickler was scheduled to share the No. 18 Toyota Tundra with team owner Kyle Busch. The truck was to be sponsored by Miccosukee Indian Gaming, but the tribe pulled out of all NASCAR sponsorship.

Ickler ran four races for the team in 2011, before taking two years off from NASCAR competition; he returned to the Camping World Truck Series in 2014, driving the No. 7 Toyota for Red Horse Racing. However, on May 20, the team was shut down.

Other racing
In 2016, Ickler ran the Stadium Super Trucks race weekend at the Charlotte Dirt Track; driving the No. 15 Arctic Cat truck, he finished sixth and eighth.

Motorsports career results

NASCAR
(key) (Bold – Pole position awarded by qualifying time. Italics – Pole position earned by points standings or practice time. * – Most laps led.)

Nationwide Series

Camping World Truck Series

Camping World East Series

Camping World West Series

ARCA Re/Max Series
(key) (Bold – Pole position awarded by qualifying time. Italics – Pole position earned by points standings or practice time. * – Most laps led.)

Stadium Super Trucks
(key) (Bold – Pole position. Italics – Fastest qualifier. * – Most laps led.)

 Season still in progress
 Ineligible for series points

References

External links
 
 

1985 births
Living people
NASCAR drivers
Stadium Super Trucks drivers
Racing drivers from San Diego
ARCA Menards Series drivers
Kyle Busch Motorsports drivers
RFK Racing drivers